Charles Veley  is an American claimant to the title of the world's most-traveled person.

Mosttraveledpeople.com
Veley operated a website, mosttraveledpeople.com, which detailed his travels and invited people to register their own travel histories. The site also allowed registered users to vote for addition or removal of items on the "Master List", a list of countries, territories, autonomous regions, enclaves, geographically separated island groups, and major states and provinces, said to make up the world. There were 949 items on the list at the time of the websites closure. No one has visited them all; Veley himself held first position.

Personal life
He lives in San Francisco, and is divorced with three children.  He graduated from Harvard College with a degree in computer science.

Further reading

The Telegraph
NBC News Also specifically states Veley as "World's most traveled man"
Washingtonian
CNN
Carmel Valley News
Stornoway Gazette
Toronto Star

References

External links
 Mosttraveledpeople.com

1965 births
Living people
American travel writers
American male non-fiction writers
Harvard College alumni